The Georgians, or Kartvelians, are a nation and indigenous Caucasian ethnic group native to Georgia and the South Caucasus. Georgian diaspora communities are also present throughout Russia, Turkey, Greece, Iran, Ukraine, United States, and European Union.

Georgians arose from Colchian and Iberian civilizations of classical antiquity; Colchis was interconnected with the Hellenic world, whereas Iberia was influenced by the Achaemenid Empire until Alexander the Great conquered it. In the 4th century, the Georgians became one of the first to embrace Christianity and now the majority of Georgians are Orthodox Christians, with most following their national autocephalous Georgian Orthodox Church, although there are small Georgian Catholic and Muslim communities as well as a significant number of irreligious Georgians. Located in the Caucasus, on the continental crossroads of Europe and Asia, the High Middle Ages saw Georgian people form a unified Kingdom of Georgia in 1008 AD, the pan-Caucasian empire, later inaugurating the Georgian Golden Age, a height of political and cultural power of the nation. This lasted until the kingdom was weakened and later disintegrated as the result of the 13th–15th-century invasions of the Mongols and Timur, the Black Death, the Fall of Constantinople, as well as internal divisions following the death of George V the Brilliant in 1346, the last of the great kings of Georgia.

Thereafter and throughout the early modern period, Georgians became politically fractured and were dominated by the Ottoman Empire and successive dynasties of Iran. Georgians started looking for allies and found the Russians on the political horizon as a possible replacement for the lost Byzantine Empire, "for the sake of the Christian faith". The Georgian kings and Russian tsars exchanged no less than 17 embassies, which culminated in 1783, when Heraclius II of the eastern Georgian kingdom of Kartli-Kakheti forged an alliance with the Russian Empire. The Russo-Georgian alliance, however, backfired as Russia was unwilling to fulfill the terms of the treaty, proceeding to annex the troubled kingdom in 1801 as well as the western Georgian kingdom of Imereti in 1810. There were several uprisings and movements to restore the statehood, the most notable being the 1832 plot, which collapsed in failure. Eventually, Russian rule over Georgia was acknowledged in various peace treaties with Iran and the Ottomans, and the remaining Georgian territories were absorbed by the Russian Empire in a piecemeal fashion through the course of the 19th century. Georgians briefly reasserted their independence from Russia under the First Georgian Republic from 1918 to 1921 and finally in 1991 from the Soviet Union.

The Georgian nation was formed out of a diverse set of geographic subgroups, each with its characteristic traditions, manners, dialects and, in the case of Svans and Mingrelians, own regional languages. The Georgian language, with its own unique writing system and extensive written tradition, which goes back to the 5th century, is the official language of Georgia as well as the language of education of all Georgians living in the country. According to the State Ministry on Diaspora Issues of Georgia, unofficial statistics say that there are more than 5 million Georgians in the world.

Etymology

Georgians call themselves Kartvelebi (ქართველები), their land Sakartvelo (საქართველო), and their language Kartuli (ქართული). According to The Georgian Chronicles, the ancestor of the Kartvelian people was Kartlos, the great-grandson of the Biblical Japheth. However, scholars agree that the word is derived from the Karts, the latter being one of the proto-Georgian tribes that emerged as a dominant group in ancient times. Kart probably is cognate with Indo-European gard and denotes people who live in a "fortified citadel". Ancient Greeks (Homer, Herodotus, Strabo, Plutarch etc.) and Romans (Titus Livius, Cornelius Tacitus, etc.) referred to western Georgians as Colchians and eastern Georgians as Iberians.

The term "Georgians" is derived from the country of Georgia. In the past, lore-based theories were given by the medieval French traveller Jacques de Vitry, who explained the name's origin by the popularity of St. George amongst Georgians, while traveller Jean Chardin thought that "Georgia" came from Greek γεωργός ("tiller of the land"), as when the Greeks came into the region (in Colchis) they encountered a developed agricultural society.

However, as Prof. Alexander Mikaberidze adds, these explanations for the word Georgians/Georgia are rejected by the scholarly community, who point to the Persian word gurğ/gurğān ("wolf") as the root of the word. Starting with the Persian word gurğ/gurğān, the word was later adopted in numerous other languages, including Slavic and West European languages. This term itself might have been established through the ancient Iranian appellation of the near-Caspian region, which was referred to as Gorgan ("land of the wolves").

Anthropology

The 18th-century German professor of medicine and member of the British Royal Society Johann Friedrich Blumenbach, widely regarded as one of the founders of the discipline of anthropology and the obsolete and disproven theory of biological race, regarded Georgians as the most beautiful race of people.

History

Most historians and scholars of Georgia as well as anthropologists, archaeologists, and linguists tend to agree that the ancestors of modern Georgians inhabited the southern Caucasus and northern Anatolia since the Neolithic period. Scholars usually refer to them as Proto-Kartvelian (Proto-Georgians such as Colchians and Iberians) tribes.

The Georgian people in antiquity have been known to the ancient Greeks and Romans as Colchians and Iberians. East Georgian tribes of Tibarenians-Iberians formed their kingdom in 7th century BCE. However, western Georgian tribes (Colchian tribes) established the first Georgian state of Colchis (circa 1350 BCE) before the foundation of the Kingdom of Iberia in the east. According to the numerous scholars of Georgia, the formations of these two early Georgian kingdoms of Colchis and Iberia, resulted in the consolidation and uniformity of the Georgian nation.

According to the renowned scholar of the Caucasian studies Cyril Toumanoff, the Moschians also were one of the early proto-Georgian tribes which were integrated into the first early Georgian state of Iberia.
The ancient Jewish chronicle by Josephus mentions Georgians as Iberes who were also called Thobel (Tubal). David Marshall Lang argued that the root Tibar gave rise to the form Iber that made the Greeks pick up the name Iberian in the end for the designation of the eastern Georgians.

Diauehi in Assyrian sources and Taochi in Greek lived in the northeastern part of Anatolia. This ancient tribe is considered by many scholars as ancestors of the Georgians. Modern Georgians still refer to this region, which now belongs to present-day Turkey, as Tao-Klarjeti, an ancient Georgian kingdom. Some people there still speak the Georgian language.

Colchians in the ancient western Georgian polity of Colchis were another proto-Georgian tribe. They are first mentioned in the Assyrian annals of Tiglath-Pileser I and in the annals of Urartian king Sarduri II, and also included western Georgian tribe of the Meskhetians.

Iberians, also known as Tiberians or Tiberanians, lived in the eastern Georgian kingdom of Iberia.

Both Colchians and Iberians played an important role in the ethnic and cultural formation of the modern Georgian nation.

According to the scholar of the Caucasian studies Cyril Toumanoff:

Genetics

An FTDNA collection of Georgian Y-DNA suggests that Georgians have the highest percentage of Haplogroup G (39.9%) among the general population recorded in any country. Georgians' Y-DNA also belongs to Haplogroup J (32.5%), R1b (8.6%), L (5.4%), R1a (4.2%),

I2 (3.8%) and other more minor haplogroups such as E, T and Q.

Culture

Language and linguistic subdivisions

Georgian is the primary language for Georgians of all provenance, including those who speak other Kartvelian languages: Svans, Mingrelians and the Laz. The language known today as Georgian is a traditional language of the eastern part of the country which has spread to most of the present-day Georgia after the post-Christianization centralization in the first millennium CE. Today, Georgians regardless of their ancestral region use Georgian as their official language. The regional languages Svan and Mingrelian are languages of the west that were traditionally spoken in the pre-Christian Kingdom of Colchis, but later lost importance as the unified Kingdom of Georgia emerged. Their decline is largely due to the capital of the unified kingdom, Tbilisi, being in the eastern part of the country known as Kingdom of Iberia effectively making the language of the east an official language of the Georgian monarch.

All of these languages comprise the Kartvelian language family along with the related language of the Laz people, which has speakers in both Turkey and Georgia.

Georgian dialects include Imeretian, Racha-Lechkhumian, Gurian, Adjarian, Imerkhevian (in Turkey), Kartlian, Kakhetian, Ingilo (in Azerbaijan), Tush, Khevsur, Mokhevian, Pshavian, Fereydan dialect in Iran in Fereydunshahr and Fereydan, Mtiuletian, Meskhetian and Javakhetian dialect.

Religion

According to Orthodox tradition, Christianity was first preached in Georgia by the Apostles Simon and Andrew in the 1st century. It became the state religion of Kartli (Iberia) in 337. At the same time, in the first centuries A.D., the cult of Mithras, pagan beliefs, and Zoroastrianism were commonly practiced in Georgia. The conversion of Kartli to Christianity is credited to St. Nino of Cappadocia. Christianity gradually replaced all the former religions except Zoroastrianism, which become a second established religion in Iberia after the Peace of Acilisene in 378. The conversion to Christianity eventually placed the Georgians permanently on the front line of conflict between the Islamic and Christian world. Georgians remained mostly Christian despite repeated invasions by Muslim powers, and long episodes of foreign domination.

As was true elsewhere, the Christian church in Georgia was crucial to the development of a written language, and most of the earliest written works were religious texts. Medieval Georgian culture was greatly influenced by Eastern Orthodoxy and the Georgian Orthodox Church, which promoted and often sponsored the creation of many works of religious devotion.  These included churches and monasteries, works of art such as icons, and hagiographies of Georgian saints.

Today, 83.9% of the Georgian population, most of whom are ethnic Georgian, follow Eastern Orthodox Christianity. 
A sizable Georgian Muslim population exists in Adjara. This autonomous Republic borders Turkey, and was part of the Ottoman Empire for a longer amount of time than other parts of the country. Those Georgian Muslims practice the Sunni Hanafi form of Islam. Islam has however declined in Adjara during the 20th century, due to Soviet anti-religious policies, cultural integration with the national Orthodox majority, and strong missionary efforts by the Georgian Orthodox Church. Islam remains a dominant identity only in the eastern, rural parts of the Republic. In the early modern period, converted Georgian recruits were often used by the Persian and Ottoman Empires for elite military units such as the Mameluks, Qizilbash, and ghulams. The Georgians in Iran are all reportedly Shia Muslims today, while the Georgian minority in Turkey are mostly Sunni Muslim.

There is also a small number of Georgian Jews, tracing their ancestors to the Babylonian captivity.

In addition to traditional religious confessions, Georgia retains irreligious segments of society, as well as a significant portion of nominally religious individuals who do not actively practice their faith.

Cuisine

The Georgian cuisine is specific to the country, but also contains some influences from other European culinary traditions, as well as those from the surrounding Western Asia. Each historical province of Georgia has its own distinct culinary tradition, such as Megrelian, Kakhetian, and Imeretian cuisines. In addition to various meat dishes, Georgian cuisine also offers a variety of vegetarian meals.

The importance of both food and drink to Georgian culture is best observed during a Caucasian feast, or supra, when a huge assortment of dishes is prepared, always accompanied by large amounts of wine, and dinner can last for hours. In a Georgian feast, the role of the tamada (toastmaster) is an important and honoured position.

In countries of the former Soviet Union, Georgian food is popular due to the immigration of Georgians to other Soviet republics, in particular Russia. In Russia all major cities have many Georgian restaurants and Russian restaurants often feature Georgian food items on their menu.

Geographic subdivisions and subethnic groups

Geographical subdivisions
The Georgians have historically been classified into various subgroups based on the geographic region which their ancestors traditionally inhabited.

Even if a member of any of these subgroups moves to a different region, they will still be known by the name of their ancestral region. For example, if a Gurian moves to Tbilisi (part of the Kartli region) he will not automatically identify himself as Kartlian despite actually living in Kartli. This may, however, change if substantial amount of time passes. For example, there are some Mingrelians who have lived in the Imereti region for centuries and are now identified as Imeretian or Imeretian-Mingrelians.

Last names from mountainous eastern Georgian provinces (such as Kakheti, etc.) can be distinguished by the suffix –uri (ური), or –uli (ული). Most Svan last names typically end in –ani (ანი), Mingrelian in –ia (ია), -ua (უა), or -ava (ავა), and Laz in –shi (ში).

The 1897 Russian census (which accounted people by language), had Imeretian, Svan and Mingrelian languages separate from Georgian.
During the 1926 Soviet census, Svans and Mingrelians were accounted separately from Georgian.
Svan and Mingrelian languages are both Kartvelian languages and are closely related to the national Georgian language.

Outside modern Georgia

Laz people also may be considered Georgian based on their geographic location and religion. According to the London School of Economics' anthropologist Mathijs Pelkmans, Lazs residing in Georgia frequently identify themselves as "first-class Georgians" to show pride, while considering their Muslim counterparts in Turkey as "Turkified Lazs".

Extinct Georgian subdivisions
Throughout history Georgia also has extinct Georgian subdivisions

See also

List of Georgians
Demographics of Georgia (country)
Georgian American
Peoples of the Caucasus

References

Bibliography 
W.E.D. Allen (1970) Russian Embassies to the Georgian Kings, 1589–1605, Hakluyt Society,  (hbk)
Eastmond, Anthony (2010), Royal Imagery in Medieval Georgia, Penn State Press
Suny, R. G. (1994), The Making of the Georgian Nation, Indiana University Press, 
Lang, D. M. (1966), The Georgians, Thames & Hudson
Rayfield, D. (2013), Edge of Empires: A History of Georgia, Reaktion Books, 
Rapp, S. H. Jr. (2016) The Sasanian World Through Georgian Eyes, Caucasia and the Iranian Commonwealth in Late Antique Georgian Literature, Sam Houston State University, USA, Routledge
Toumanoff, C. (1963) Studies in Christian Caucasian History, Georgetown University Press

 
Ethnic groups in Azerbaijan
Ethnic groups in Georgia (country)
Ethnic groups in Greece
Ethnic groups in Iran
Ethnic groups in Russia
Ethnic groups in the Middle East
Ethnic groups in Turkey
Indigenous peoples of Europe
Indigenous peoples of Western Asia
 
 
Peoples of the Caucasus
 
Tribes in Greco-Roman historiography